E collar may refer to:

Elizabethan collar, a protective medical device worn by an animal
Shock collar, an electronic training aid